Equalizer, Equaliser, or The Equalizer may refer to:

Science and technology
 Equalizer (audio), a device used for adjusting the volume of different frequency bands within an audio signal
 Equalizer (communications), a device or circuit for correction of frequency dependent distortion in telecommunications
 Equaliser (mathematics), a construction in category theory
 Whippletree (mechanism), a linkage also referred to as an equalizer

Arts and entertainment
 Equalizer (Datel), a game-hacking cheat cartridge by Datel
 "Equalizer" (k-os song), a song by hip hop artist k-os
 The Equalizer, an American spy thriller television and film franchise including:
 The Equalizer (1985 TV series)
 The Equalizer (2021 TV series), reboot of the 1985 TV series
 The Equalizer (film), a 2014 film loosely based on the 1985 TV series
 The Equalizer 2, a 2018 film and the sequel to the 2014 film
 The Equalizer 3, an upcoming film and the sequel to the 2018 film
 Dave Sullivan (wrestler) (born 1960), American retired wrestler, stagename "The Equalizer"
 Equalizers, the magical girl protagonists in the Japanese multimedia franchise The Girl in Twilight
 "The Equalizer", an NFL Films song by Sam Spence

Other uses
 GAU-12 Equalizer, a type of Gatling gun
 Equaliser (sports), a goal or run that ties the game

See also
 Equalizer hitch, a type of towing hitch used to better distribute the load on a towing vehicle
 Equalization (disambiguation)
 Equal (disambiguation)